By the Beautiful Sea may refer to:

 "By the Beautiful Sea" (song), a 1914 popular song
 By the Beautiful Sea (musical), a 1954 musical